Walter Dei Vecchi (born 22 March 1956) is an Argentine alpine skier. He competed in the men's slalom at the 1976 Winter Olympics.

References

1956 births
Living people
Argentine male alpine skiers
Olympic alpine skiers of Argentina
Alpine skiers at the 1976 Winter Olympics
Place of birth missing (living people)